The Israeli Premier League (Ligat Ha`Al), is a professional association football league which operates as the highest division of the Israeli Football League – the state's league of Israel. The league is contested by 14 clubs, and operates on a system of promotion and relegation with its second division Liga Leumit. Seasons run from August to May, with teams playing between 33 and 36 matches each, totalling 240 matches in every season.

The competition formed in 1999 following the decision of the Israel Football Association to form a new league. It is also ranked 21st in the UEFA coefficients of leagues based on performances in European competitions over the last five years.

Since 1932, a total of 15 clubs have been crowned champions of the Israeli Football League. Of the thirty clubs to have competed since the inception of the Israeli Premier League in 1999, six have won the title: Beitar Jerusalem (twice), Hapoel Be'er Sheva (three times), Hapoel Tel Aviv (twice), Maccabi Haifa (seven times), Maccabi Tel Aviv (six times), and Ironi Kiryat Shmona (once). The current champions are Maccabi Haifa, who won the 2021–22 season.

Background

The Israeli Premier League was founded in 1999 to replace its predecessor Liga Leumit (which became the second division) when the Israel Football Association decided to reshuffle all the leagues in hopes of improving competition. In its first season there were 14 clubs; the top thirteen clubs from the 1998–99 season and the top place club from the Liga Artzit (then, the third division). That season three clubs were relegated and one from Liga Leumit was promoted.

Competition
There are 14 clubs in the league. At the end of each season, the two lowest-placed teams are relegated to Liga Leumit while two highest-placed teams of Liga Leumit are promoted in their place. For the 2012–13 season the league was decreased from 16 to 14 clubs as a result of reforms passed by the IFA on 27 June 2011.

The participating clubs first play a conventional round-robin schedule for a total of 26 matches.

Following this, the top six teams play in a championship playoff, where they meet each other twice. Upon its conclusion, the first place team wins the Israeli championship and qualifies to participate in the first qualifying round of the 2021–22 UEFA Champions League. The runners-up and the third-placed teams qualify for the second qualifying round of the 2021–22 UEFA Europa Conference League.

In addition, the Israeli State Cup winners qualify for the second qualifying round of the 2021–22 UEFA Europa Conference League.

If the State Cup winners are also one of the teams to finish in the league's top three places then the fourth-placed team will also play in Europa League. In case the State Cup winners also win the Israeli Premier League then the fourth-placed league team will play in second qualifying round of the 2021–22 UEFA Europa Conference League.

In addition, the bottom eight teams will play each other once to avoid two relegation spots.

Clubs 

A total of 30 clubs have played in the Israeli Premier League from its inception in 1999 and the start of the 2022–23 season. For a list of winners and runners-up of the Israeli Premier League since its inception, and top scorers for each season, see List of Israeli football champions.

Three clubs have been members of the Israeli Premier League for every season since its inception. This group is composed of Beitar Jerusalem, Maccabi Haifa, and Maccabi Tel Aviv.

Members of the 2022–23 season 

The following 14 clubs will compete in the Israeli Premier League during the 2021–22 season.

Sponsorship
In recent years, the league has been sponsored. The sponsor has been able to determine the league's sponsorship name. The list below details who the sponsors have been and what they called the competition:
 1999–2002: Pelephone – a mobile phone company (Ligat Pelephone)
 2005–2010: Toto Winner Organization – the Israeli Sports Betting Board (Ligat Toto)
 2010–2016: Toto Winner Organization – the Israeli Sports Betting Board (Ligat Winner)
 2016–2018: Toto Winner Organization – the Israeli Sports Betting Board (Ligat Ha'al)
 2018–2019: Japanika – Asian restaurant (Ligat Japanika)
 2019–2022: Tel Aviv Stock Exchange – Stock Exchange (Ligat Habursa Leniyarot Erech)
 2022–2024: ONE ZERO – Digital Bank (Ligat ONE ZERO)

Number of foreigners
Teams are limited to six foreign players per team. Special circumstances such as Druze players from the Golan (no citizenship) or cases such as that of Toto Tamuz, do not count against the foreign player limit.
In addition, players who play in the league for 6 consecutive years do not count against the foreign player limit. Also, Jewish players and players who are married to Israelis are exempt from these restrictions, as they are entitled to Israeli citizenship.

Broadcast Rights

Television
Israeli Premier League games are broadcast live on Sport 1, Sport 1 HD, and Sport 2 channels, with the big match of the week which is reserved to be shown by Sport 5 and Channel 1 HD network television. There is also a league review show on Saturday nights at Sport 5 channel.

Abroad, rights to broadcasting in Hebrew are owned by The Israeli Network which broadcasts the matches in the United States, Canada, Australia, New Zealand, Panama, Costa Rica and in Europe.

In the United Kingdom, William Hill broadcasts matches live with English commentary on their online television service, William Hill TV.

Radio
The rights of broadcasting on the radio belongs to Radio Tel Aviv since 2011, which broadcast alongside Radio Haifa, Radio Darom, Radio Galei Zahal and Radio Darom 101.5 in a show called Saturday of Football which also broadcasts live on ONE TV channel.

Internet
The big match of the week is shown on the Channel 1 website. Since 2010, games summaries are shown online by Ynet, ONE and Sport 5.

Cellular
Since 2012, ONE owns the broadcasting rights, which was previously owned by Sport 5.

Revenue
Main sources of revenue for the clubs:

 Broadcast rights
 Ticket sales
 Merchandise
 Toto Winner – The Israeli Sports Betting Council
 Sponsorship

UEFA league ranking
In European Leagues:

As of 8 September 2022 the coefficients are as follows:
 19.  (18)  Danish Superliga (24.625)
 20.  (20)  Super League Greece (23.700)
 21  (22)  Israeli Premier League (23.250)
 22.  (21)   Cypriot First Division (22.275)
 23.  (23)  Allsvenskan (20.750)
Source: UEFA Coefficients Graphs, 2023 UEFA Country Ranking

Champions
For the complete list read the main article.

Israeli Premier League (1999–present)

When the Israeli Premier League became the top division of Israeli football in 1999–2000, Liga Leumit became the second division. Since then, only six clubs have won the title; Hapoel Tel Aviv, Ironi Kiryat Shmona, Maccabi Haifa, Maccabi Tel Aviv, Beitar Jerusalem and Hapoel Be'er Sheva. Hapoel Tel Aviv, Maccabi Haifa, Maccabi Tel Aviv and Beitar Jerusalem are sometimes referred to as the "Big Four" of Israeli football.

Having won nine titles in the league's 23 seasons, the most successful club during this period is Maccabi Haifa; during the same period Maccabi Tel Aviv have added six to their total while Beitar Jerusalem and Hapoel Tel Aviv have won two championships each. Although Hapoel Tel Aviv have only finished top of the league twice since 1999—in 1999–2000 and ten years later in 2009–10—they have won the double on both occasions.

This achievement was matched by Beitar Jerusalem in 2007–08. Ironi Kiryat Shmona won their first championship during the 2011–12 season, thereby becoming the first northern title-winners. Maccabi Tel Aviv then won three titles in a row, including a Treble in 2014–15.

Key

"Big Four" dominance

Since the 2015–16 season, the Big Four's Dominance has been challenged by Hapoel Be'er Sheva, winning 3 successive championships, they also finished runners up in the 2021-22 season.

Notably, three of the big four teams all finished near or at the bottom of the table at some point. (Hapoel Tel Aviv has been the only one to be relegated so far)

Top scorers by season

Individual records

Appearances

Top scorers

Player transfer fees

All-time table
The All-time Israeli Premier League table is a cumulative record of all match results, points and goals of every team that has played in the Israeli Premier League since its inception in 1999. The table that follows is accurate as of the end of the 2021–22 season. Teams in green are part of the 2022–23 Israeli Premier League. Numbers in bold are the record (highest) numbers in each column.

Notes

Record of finishing positions of clubs in the Israeli Premier League

Table correct as at the end of the 2021–22 Israeli Premier League season.

See also
Football in Israel
Israel national football team
Israel Football League
Ligat Nashim

References

External links
  IPFL
 Israel Football Association
 Summary - Ligat ha'Al - Israel - Results, fixtures, tables and news - Soccerway Soccerway

 

 
1
Israel
Professional sports leagues in Israel